This list of ecoregions in Arkansas provides an overview of ecoregions in the U.S. state of Arkansas designated by the U.S. Environmental Protection Agency (EPA) and the Commission for Environmental Cooperation (CEC). The Commission's 1997 report, Ecological Regions of North America, provides a spatial framework that may be used by government agencies, non-governmental organizations, and academic researchers as a basis for risk analysis, resource management, and environmental study of the continent's ecosystems. Ecoregions may be identified by similarities in geology, physiography, vegetation, climate, soils, land use, wildlife distributions, and hydrology.

The classification system has four levels. Levels III, and IV are shown on this list. Level I divides North America into 15 ecoregions; of these, the entire state is within the Eastern Temperate Forests level. Subdividing the Eastern Temperate Forests, Arkansas is split among three Level II ecoregions: the Southeastern Plains, Ozark, Ouachita, Appalachian Forests, and the Mississippi Alluvial and Southeast USA Coastal Plains. Level III subdivides the continent into 182 ecoregions; of these, seven lay partly within Arkansas's borders. Level IV is a further subdivision of Level III ecoregions. There are 32 Level IV ecoregions in Arkansas, many of which continue into adjacent areas in the neighboring states of Oklahoma, Mississippi, Missouri, Louisiana, Tennessee, and Texas.

The task of defining and mapping these ecoregions was carried out by the United States Environmental Protection Agency (EPA) Region 6, EPA-National Health and Environmental Effects Research Laboratory (Corvallis, Oregon), and the Multi-Agency Wetland Planning Team. The new classification system they developed may differ from previous frameworks developed separately by the agencies.

Arkansas is ecologically diverse. Though often simplistically split into halves from southwest to northeast, with "uplands" in the northwest half and "lowlands" in the southeastern half, the CEC system of levels reveals the diverse forests and floodplains, prairies and plateaus, ridges and river bottoms, and loess hills and lowlands of Arkansas.

35 South Central Plains

35a Tertiary Uplands
35b Floodplains and Low Terraces
35c Pleistocene Fluvial Terraces
35d Cretaceous Dissected Uplands
35g Red River Bottomlands
35h Blackland Prairie

36 Ouachita Mountains

36a Athens Plateau
36b Central Mountain Ranges
36c Central Hills, Ridges, and Valleys
36d Fourche Mountains
36e Western Ouachitas

37 Arkansas Valley

37a Scattered High Ridges and Mountains
37b Arkansas River Floodplain
37c Arkansas Valley Hills
37d Arkansas Valley Plains

38 Boston Mountains

38a Upper Boston Mountains
38b Lower Boston Mountains

39 Ozark Highlands

39a Springfield Plateau
39b Dissected Springfield Plateau–Elk River Hills
39c White River Hills
39d Central Plateau

73 Mississippi Alluvial Plain

73a Northern Holocene Meander Belts
73b Northern Pleistocene Valley Trains
73c St. Francis Lowlands
73d Northern Backswamps
73e Grand Prairie
73f Western Lowlands Holocene Meander Belts
73g Western Lowlands Pleistocene Valley Trains
73h Arkansas/Ouachita River Holocene Meander Belts
73i Arkansas/Ouachita River Backswamps
73j Macon Ridge

74 Mississippi Valley Loess Plains

74a Bluff Hills

Notes

References

Ecoregions of the United States
Regions of Arkansas
 
Arkansas